Ideratus virginiae is a species of beetle in the family Cerambycidae. It was described by Dalens and Tavakilian in 2006.

References

Cerambycinae
Beetles described in 2006